François Leterrier (26 May 1929 – 4 December 2020) was a French film director and actor. He entered the film industry when he was cast in Robert Bresson's film A Man Escaped. After this he went on to become a director himself.

Life and career
François Leterrier studied at the University of Paris where he took a degree in philosophy. During his student years he frequently attended the university's film club. He did his military service in Morocco, where he was discovered by the film director Robert Bresson, known for casting unknowns, who gave him the leading role in the 1956 film A Man Escaped. After this, Leterrier was able to work as an assistant director for Louis Malle, Etienne Périer and Yves Allégret. His first film as director was Les Mauvais Coups from 1961, based on a novel by Roger Vailland. He also went on to adapt works by Jean Giono, Paul Morand and Raymond Queneau.

François's son Louis is a film director notable for his action and blockbuster films such as the first two Transporter films, The Incredible Hulk, Clash of the Titans and Now You See Me.

Filmography

Directed for film
 Les Mauvais Coups (1961)
 A King Without Distraction (Un roi sans divertissement) (1963)
 The Royal Chase (La Chasse royale) (1969)
 Private Screening (Projection privée) (1973)
 Goodbye Emmanuelle (1977)
 Your Turn, My Turn (Va voir maman, papa travaille) (1978)
 Rat Race (Je vais craquer) (1980)
 Les Babas Cool (1981)
 Le Garde du corps (1984)
 Tranches de vie (1985)
 The Son of the Mekong (Le Fils du Mékong) (1992)

Directed for television
 La Guêpe (1965)
 Milady (1976)
 Pierrot mon ami (1979)
 Le Voleur d'enfants (1981)
 Le Cœur du voyage (1986)
 L'Île (1987)
 Imogène (1989, 3 episodes)
 Clovis (1993, 2 episodes)
 Les Disparus de Reillanne (1993)

Actor
 A Man Escaped (1956) - Le lieutenant Fontaine
 Stavisky (1974) - André Malraux (final film role)

References

1929 births
2020 deaths
20th-century French male actors
French film directors
French television directors
People from Oise
French male film actors